The Cid Formation is a metavolcanic rock and mudstone geologic formation in North Carolina. It consists of a lower unnamed mudstone member with intermittent volcanic flows and the Flat Swamp Member, which is characterized by pyroclastic flows. It preserves fossils dating back to the Ediacaran period.

See also

 List of fossiliferous stratigraphic units in North Carolina

References

 

Ediacaran geology of North Carolina